Academic Writing Month (also known as "AcWriMo") is an annual Web-based writing event challenging participants to meet a self-set writing goal during the month of November. It is based on National Novel Writing Month ("NaNoWriMo") and other variations of this model including National Blog Posting Month ("NaBloPoMo") and National Poetry Writing Month ("NaPoWriMo").

It was established by Charlotte Frost and the academic resource PhD2Published, a blog geared towards helping early-career academics learn how to get published. Sites such as Chronicle of Higher Education, The Teaching Tomtom, and Get a Life, PhD, have featured the project.

Participants register for AcWriMo by signing up on the Accountability Spreadsheet, and by posting an initial declaration of intention on the PhD2Published blog post announcing the start of the project, on the site's Facebook page, or by using the Twitter hashtag "#AcWriMo."

History 
The project was originally called Academic Book Writing Month (or AcBoWriMo) and was created by Charlotte Frost when she was a Provost International Post-Doctoral Fellow at the Center for 21st Century Studies at the University of Wisconsin–Milwaukee (UWM). Frost aimed to develop an event that would push her and her colleagues to work on their respective academic writing projects and create a writing “team” among them and the wider global academic community.

The inaugural event took place November 2011 with over one hundred participants sharing their progress on their blogs and social media accounts; such blogs include Goanatree, Sound & Fury, Finds and Features, The Ambulant Scholar, Emily and the Lime, Read React Review, Glorious Generalist, Standardized Teacher, A Dozen Pickled Limes, Dacia Takes Note, and Constance Kassor. Frost also discussed the start of AcBoWriMo on her own blog.

The vast majority of participants claimed to have enjoyed the month-long writing support group who communicated primarily on Twitter. A few dissonant voices argued that writing quality might be compromised by working intensively or that the project could give the impression that academic writing can and should be a fast process. As noted on UWM's website:

"Criticism has come mainly related to the name. 'A couple of people took it a little too literally and thought I was suggesting you could write an entire, quality academic book in one month, which of course I’m not,' notes Charlotte. Such criticism has been constructive, though, as Charlotte considers ways to improve next year’s event and continue the movement. One possibility is the inclusion of a broader discussion on the nature of academic work. Different subject areas have different demands, and some tasks can be completed quickly while others require a slower and more considered process. While Charlotte has been quick to embrace social media as a communication and team-building tool for the challenge, she also acknowledges that the juxtaposition of instant communication with a discipline that may not move at that speed is a challenge and worthy of a dialogue."

Frost responded to critics while the project spoke for itself: many participants continued with the project through December 2011 and adapted a new Twitter hashtag (#AcWri) to refer to the project's more general focus on academic writing. Additionally, other participants defended Frost and the project.

In 2012 Frost decided to widen the remit and removed the ‘bo’ (referring to book) dedicating the event to all forms of academic writing

Participation 
Each year AcWriMo is organised by Frost through her resource PhD2Published. The PhD2Published website publishes a variety of blog posts on academic writing. Other components include a public accountability spreadsheet and the hashtag #AcWriMo. There is even an application designed with AcWriMo participants in mind called the PhDometer. Although there are far fewer resources than the unconnected NaNoWriMo event.

Every year participants abide by the set of 6 rules:

 You have to decide on a goal where you count either words, hours or projects.
 You declare your goal by signing up on the ‘Accountability Spreadsheet’
 You then draft your approach to the month, making sure you have done enough preparation to write a lot.
 You discuss your progress on social media like Twitter and Facebook.
 You have to work really hard and not get distracted.
 And at the end you must publicly declare your results on the spreadsheet or on social media.

AcWriMo has been featured in the Guardian, the Chronicle, and over a hundred other online articles and blog posts.

In 2013 Frost partnered with Dr Jesse Stommel to conduct a live workshop in Google Docs on writing collaboratively using Google Docs, from their respective locations Hong Kong and the United States. In December 2013 Digital Humanities Now made this project their ‘editor’s choice’.

AcWri hashtag and community 
At the end of the 2011 event founding members of the Academic Writing Month community decided to use the shortened ‘#AcWri’ (Academic Writing) hashtag for communication about academic writing all year round. Following this, live ‘#AcWri’ discussions were organised by then editor of PhD2Published Dr Anna Tarrant and Dr Jeremy Seagrott.

References 

November observances
Writing contests
Recurring events established in 2011
2011 establishments in the United States
Month-long observances